Babai is a surname. Notable people with the surname include:

Béla Babai (1914–1997), Romani musician and interpreter
László Babai (born 1950), Hungarian mathematician

See also
 Babai (disambiguation)
 Baba (disambiguation)